Broadcast Music, Inc. (BMI) is a performance rights organization in the United States. It collects blanket license fees from businesses that use music, entitling those businesses to play or sync any songs from BMI's repertoire of over 20.6 million musical works.  On a quarterly basis, BMI distributes the money to songwriters, composers, and music publishers as royalties to those members whose works have been performed.

In FY 2022, BMI collected $1.573 billion in revenues and distributed $1.471 billion in royalties. BMI's repertoire includes over 1.3 million songwriters and 20.6 million compositions. BMI is the biggest performing rights organization in the United States and is one of the largest such organizations in the world.

BMI songwriters create music in virtually every genre. BMI represents artists such as Patti LaBelle, Selena, Miley Cyrus, Lil Wayne, Lil Nas X, Birdman, Lady Gaga, Taylor Swift, Eminem, Rihanna, Shakira, Doja Cat, Megan Thee Stallion, Ed Sheeran, Karol G, J Balvin, Sam Cooke, Willie Nelson, Fats Domino and Dolly Parton; bands as diverse as Evanescence, Red Hot Chili Peppers, Linkin Park, Twenty One Pilots and Fifth Harmony; and composers such as Harry Gregson-Williams, John Williams, Danny Elfman, Hildur Guðnadóttir, Ludwig Göransson, and Oscar-winning songwriters Richard & Robert Sherman. BMI also represents Michael Jackson's music catalog, Sony/ATV Music Publishing, which features the late artist's music as well as the largest repertoire of any catalog in history.

In 1961, BMI co-founded the BMI Lehman Engel Musical Theater Workshop, which fosters new musical theater writing talent. Notable alumni have included Alan Menken, Robert Lopez, Jeanine Tesori, and the songwriting team of Lynn Ahrens and Stephen Flaherty. In recognition of its contributions to musical theater, the BMI Lehman Engel Musical Theatre Workshop has won both a Tony Award and a Drama Desk Award.

History
In the 1930s, radio was coming to prominence as a source of musical entertainment that threatened to weaken record sales and opportunities for "live" acts. The Great Depression was already draining artist revenues from recordings and live performances. ASCAP, the pre-eminent royalty/licensing agency for more than two decades, required radio stations to subscribe to "blanket" licenses granting ASCAP a fixed percentage of each station's revenue, regardless of how much music the station played from ASCAP's repertoire.  In 1939, ASCAP announced a substantial increase in the revenue share licensees would be required to pay. BMI was founded by the National Association of Broadcasters to provide a lower-cost alternative to ASCAP. As such, BMI created competition in the field of performing rights, providing an alternative source of licensing for all music users.

The vast majority of U.S. radio stations, and all three radio networks, refused to renew their ASCAP licenses for 1941, choosing to forgo playing ASCAP music entirely and relying on the BMI repertoire. In February 1941, similar to the agreement it had made with ASCAP, the Department of Justice and BMI entered into a consent decree, requiring certain changes to BMI's business model, including giving licensees the option of paying only for the music they actually used instead of buying a blanket license.  The U.S. District Court in Milwaukee was chosen by the Justice Department to supervise the decree for both BMI and ASCAP.

Competing against the strongly established ASCAP, BMI sought out artists that ASCAP tended to overlook or ignore. BMI also purchased the rights to numerous catalogs held by independent publishers or whose ASCAP contracts were about to expire.  To attract newer writers, BMI proposed to compensate songwriters and publishers on the basis of a fixed fee per performance, as opposed to ASCAP's two-tier system, which discriminated against less-established songwriters.  Thus, despite its original motivation regarding radio station royalties and its focus on radio station revenues versus artist revenues, BMI became the first performing rights organization in the United States to represent songwriters of blues, jazz, rhythm and blues, gospel (black genres, performers, and writers that ASCAP did not want to represent), country, folk, Latin, and—ultimately—rock and roll. During the 1940s and 1950s, BMI was the primary licensing organization for country artists and R&B artists, while ASCAP centered on more established Pop artists. Also during that time, BMI expanded its repertoire of classical music, and now represents the majority of the members of the prestigious American Academy of Arts and Letters and the winners of 31 Pulitzer Prizes for Music.

BMI's practice of selling only "blanket licenses", rather than licenses for individual songs, led to a major antitrust law dispute between BMI and CBS, that resulted in the 1979 case, Broadcast Music, Inc. v. CBS, Inc., in which the U.S. Supreme Court held that the  prohibition of "price fixing" by the Sherman Act was not strictly literal, and should be interpreted in light of the economic efficiencies an agreement brings.

In July 2017, BMI renewed long-term partnership with C3 Presents, the world's largest music festival producers.

Business
BMI issues licenses to users of music, including:
 Television and radio stations
 Websites
 Digital services providers (DSPs)
 Broadcast and cable networks
 The internet and mobile technologies
 Satellite radio services such as Sirius XM
 Nightclubs, hotels, bars, restaurants, breweries
 Symphony orchestras, concert bands, and classical chamber music ensembles
 Digital jukeboxes
 Colleges
 Fitness facilities
 Live concerts

BMI tracks public performances from among a repertoire of more than 20.6 million musical works. BMI collects blanket fees from users of music such as radio stations, TV stations, and live venues. After deducting its operating expenses off the top, on a quarterly basis BMI distributes the money as Performance Royalties to its member songwriters, composers, and music publishers, according to a royalty calculation formula.  BMI has offices in Atlanta, London, Los Angeles, Nashville, New York, Austin, and Washington, D.C..

Awards

BMI annually hosts award shows that honor the songwriters, composers and music publishers of the year's most-performed songs in the BMI catalog. BMI Award shows include the BMI Latin Awards, BMI Pop Awards, BMI Film/TV Awards, BMI R&B/Hip-Hop Awards, BMI London Awards, BMI Country Awards, BMI Christian Awards, and the BMI Trailblazers of Gospel Music Honors.

BMI Lehman Engel Musical Theater Workshop
In 1961, BMI and Lehman Engel founded the BMI Lehman Engel Musical Theater Workshop. Engel supervised the workshop and led weekly sessions until his death in 1982, and subsequently Maury Yeston led for the next 23 years. Since its inception, a number of works have been created by members and alumni. 

On May 21, 2006, the Drama Desk awarded the BMI Workshop a Special Award "for nurturing, developing and promoting new talent for the musical theater." On September 22, 2006, it was announced that the BMI Workshop was one of the recipients of the Tony Honors for Excellence in Theatre.

See also
CISAC
 ASCAP
BMI Foundation
 Copyright collective
 Recording Academy
 David Sanjek
 Ottalie Mark

References

Further reading
 Choquette, Frederic, "The Returned Value of PROs", Music Business Journal, Berklee College of Music, May 2011
Broadcast Music, Inc. (BMI) collection at the University of Maryland libraries

 
Music licensing organizations
Organizations established in 1939
1939 establishments in the United States
Music organizations based in the United States
Organizations based in New York City